The Redondo Beach Transit Center, formerly the South Bay Galleria Transit Center, is a bus station in Redondo Beach that serves as a transport hub (known locally as a transit center) for residents and businesses located within the walking distances of Redondo Beach, Lawndale, and Torrance. The station consists of one large island platform with 11 bus bays and a 320-space park and ride parking lot located next to the transit center. 

The station is also currently being considered over whether or not to be served by the C Line of the Los Angeles Metro Rail system via two of the potential routes of its proposed extension to Torrance.

History
The original transit center, which was located closer to Artesia Boulevard, opened in 1985 when the South Bay Galleria reopened. Plans for a new transit center dated back to early 2000. City Council and the Planning Commission approved the project's planning, design, and preliminary funding in 2009.

After a decade of inactivity for said project, groundbreaking and construction began in 2020. The transit center reopened on January 29, 2023, with Metro and GTrans being the first to serve the station. Torrance Transit began serving the station on January 30, 2023. Beach Cities Transit is set to start serving the station on February 13, 2023. However, school trippers will not stop at the station. Lawndale Beat will resume their Residential Route on April 1, 2023, while their Express Route remains dormant until further notice.

Layout
The newer facility has 11 bus bays, 320 parking spaces collectively on both the upper and lower levels, bike lockers, public restrooms, and a staff lounge.

Services
Many local bus routes will serve the Redondo Beach Transit Center: Los Angeles Metro Bus  to Patsaouras Transit Plaza;  to Hollywood/Vine station;  to Downtown Inglewood station; GTrans Line 3 to Martin Luther King Jr. station in Compton; Beach Cities Transit between the Redondo Beach station and the Redondo Beach pier; Torrance Transit line 2 between El Camino College and Del Amo Fashion Center; and Lawndale Beat to the Redondo Beach station.

References 

Transport infrastructure completed in 2023
2023 establishments in California
Bus stations in Los Angeles County, California
Redondo Beach, California